Composition for Twelve Instruments (1948, rev. 1954) is a serial music composition written by American composer Milton Babbitt for flute, oboe, clarinet, bassoon, horn, trumpet, harp, celesta, violin, viola, cello, and double bass. In it Babbitt for the first time employs a twelve-element duration set to serialize the rhythms as well as the pitches, predating Olivier Messiaen's (non-serial) "Mode de valeurs et d'intensités", but not the Turangalîla-Symphonie (1946–48), in which Messiaen used a duration series for the first time in the opening episode of the seventh movement, titled "Turangalîla II". (Babbitt had also earlier used a different kind of rhythmic series, and serial manipulation thereof, in his Three Compositions for Piano (1947) and Composition for Four Instruments (1948)).

Babbitt's use of rhythm in Composition for Twelve Instruments was criticized by Peter Westergaard in Perspectives of New Music: "can we be expected to hear a family resemblance between a dotted half note followed by a sixteenth note (the opening 'interval' of duration set P0) and an eighth note followed by a dotted eighth note (the opening 'interval' of duration set P2)?" He would later employ an approach based on time-points, which Westergaard described as a solution to the above problems.

The combinatorial tone row used may be represented: 0 1 4 9 5 8 3 t 2 e 6 7

Discography
 Slowly Expanding Milton Babbitt Album: Composition for Twelve Instruments (1948, rev. 1954). Julietta Curenton (flute); James Austin Smith (oboe); Joshua Rubin (clarinet); Rebekah Heller (bassoon); David Byrd-Marrow (horn); Peter Evans (trumpet); Nuiko Wadden (harp); Steve Beck (celesta); Erik Carlson (violin); Chris Otto (viola); Chris Gross (cello); Randy Zigler (bass), produced by Erik Carlson, 2013. https://erikcarlson.bandcamp.com/track/composition-for-twelve-instruments

Sources

Further reading
 Borders, Barbara Ann (1979). "Formal Aspects in Selected Instrumental Works of Milton Babbitt," Ph.D. dissertation, Lawrence: University of Kansas.
Hush, David (1982–83). "Asynordinate Twelve-Tone Structures: Milton Babbitt's Compositions for Twelve Instruments (Part 1)". Perspectives of New Music 21, nos. 1–2: 152–208. Cited in Vander Weg (2000), p. 56. . Also cited in Cited in Mead (1989), 11:1, p. 45. . Also cited in Dubiel 1990 28:2, p. 251 . Also cited in Roig-Franconi (2001) 41, p. 88 .
Hush, David (1983–84). "Asynordinate Twelve-Tone Structures: Milton Babbitt's Compositions for Twelve Instruments (Part 2)". Perspectives of New Music 22, nos. 1–2 (Fall-Winter/Spring-Summer): 103–16. Cited in Mead (1989a), 11:1, p. 45. .

Compositions by Milton Babbitt
1948 compositions
20th-century classical music
Chamber music compositions
Compositions for duodecet
Serial compositions